Mos is a municipality in the province of Pontevedra in Galicia, Spain.  Mos is adjacent to Vigo.

The Louro River floods through Mos from north to south, making the municipality a valley region.

There is no significant urban nucleus and most of the population live scattered across the municipality. Family-owned farms and vineyards are very common.

Weather 
The key feature of the climate of Mos is the existence of two very different microclimates, a mountain and a valley, represented near Comber and O Porriño, respectively. The average temperature is 14.05 °C.

Education 
Mos has a high school, the IES de Mos.

Mos is home to the O Castro British School, which starts from nursery through to KS4.

Economy 
Mos has a strong industry, and because of its geographical position between Vigo and the Portuguese border, it is crossed by many transport infrastructures. Recently, the announcement of the construction of a high-speed railway track and a new highway has resulted in numerous demonstrations and protests.

Government 
Since December 2008, the municipality has been governed by Nidia Arévalo, former People's Party councilor after a vote of no confidence.

Communications 
Four major roads cross southern Galicia Mos: the N-550 (Tui - A Coruña), AP-9 (Atlantic Highway), the A-52 (Vigo, Ourense) and A-55 (Vigo-Portugal).

Vigo Airport (VGO) is partially in the boundaries of Mos.

Notable people
 María Magdalena Domínguez (1922-2021), poet

References

Municipalities in the Province of Pontevedra